Sathish Ninan (born on 1 April 1968) is the judge of Kerala High Court.The  High Court of Kerala  is the highest court in the Indian state of Kerala and in the Union Territory of Lakshadweep. The High Court of Kerala is headquartered at Ernakulam, Kochi.

Early life
Ninan was born to O. N. Ninan and Naliny Ninan at Ooriapadikkal, Thiruvalla, on 1 April 1968. He obtained a law degree from Government Law College, Thiruvananthapuram and master's degree in law from  Mahatma Gandhi University, Kottayam.

Career
He enrolled as an advocate on 2 December 1990 and started practicing in civil, constitution, banking and property law. On 5 October 2016 he was elevated as additional judge of High Court of Kerala and became permanent from 16 March 2018.

References

External links
 High Court of Kerala

Living people
Judges of the Kerala High Court
21st-century Indian judges
1968 births
People from Thiruvalla